Otto Dowidat (October 27, 1896 – July 4, 1975) was a German politician of the Free Democratic Party (FDP) and former member of the German Bundestag.

Life 
Dowidat was a member of the German Bundestag from 1957 to 1961. He entered the Bundestag via the North Rhine-Westphalia state list.

Literature

References

1896 births
1975 deaths
Members of the Bundestag for North Rhine-Westphalia
Members of the Bundestag 1957–1961
Members of the Bundestag for the Free Democratic Party (Germany)